A fifer is a non-combatant military occupation of a foot soldier who originally played the fife during combat.

Fifer may also refer to:

 Fifer (Scotland), a native of Fife

People 
 James Fifer (1930–1986), American rower
 Joseph W. Fifer (1840–1938), Republican governor of Illinois
 Richard Fifer Carles (born 1957), Panamanian businessman and politician
 Robert Fifer (born 1956), American business consultant, author and speaker
 Scott Fifer, founder of GO Campaign

Characters
 Nicki Fifer, on The Drew Carey Show portrayed by Kate Walsh

Other uses
 The Fifer (or Young Flautist), an 1866 painting by French painter Édouard Manet
 Fifer, a Five-wicket haul in cricket

See also
Fife (disambiguation)
Fyffe (disambiguation)
Fyfe, a name
Fief, a central element of feudalism